Alessandro Ghebreigziabiher (born May 20, 1968 in Naples, Italy) is an Italian writer, storyteller and stage actor.

Biography 

Ghebreigziabiher was born in Naples to an Eritrean father and an Italian mother and currently lives in Rome. There, he obtained a Computer science University degree at La Sapienza University.

He is author of novels and short stories, a professional storyteller often involved in intercultural and anti-racist education with projects and festivals.

His first book, Tramonto (Sunset), Lapis Edizioni, in 2003 was included by the International Youth Library inside The White Ravens, an annual list that includes 250 books from around the world considered especially noteworthy.

Since 2007 he was artistic director of the Italian Storytelling Festival Il dono della diversità ("The gift of diversity"), thirteenth edition in 2019.

Barry Bradford, American speaker, historian and writer who contributed to reopen the Edgar Ray Killen case, appreciated his short story Il coraggio della speranza ("The courage of hope"), about James Chaney, Andrew Goodman, Michael Schwerner, and wrote the preface for his book Amori diversi ("Different Loves").

In 2016 he founded the international group Storytellers for Peace, composed of artists from around the world, with the aim of creating collective videos in several languages about peace and human rights.

An excerpt from his book Tramonto (Sunset) was published in English on Afropean.com, part of The Guardian newspaper's "Africa Network".

Bibliography

Novels

Il poeta, il santo e il navigatore (2006, Fermento Editore) 
L'intervallo (2008, Intermezzi Editore) 
La truffa dei migranti (2015, Tempesta Editore) 
Elisa e il meraviglioso mondo degli oggetti (2016, Tempesta Editore) 
Carla senza di Noi (2017, Graphofeel Edizioni) 
Lo strano vizio del professor Mann (2019, Ofelia Editrice) 
Matematica delle parole (2019, Toutcourt Edizioni) 
A morte i razzisti (2020, Oakmond Publishing) 
Agata nel paese che non legge (2021, NEM Editore)

Illustrated children books

Tramonto (2002, Edizioni Lapis) 
Tra la terra e l'acqua (2008, Camelozampa Editore) 
Roba da bambini (2014, Tempesta Editore) 
Tramonto, la favola del figlio di Buio e Luce (2017, Tempesta Editore)

Collected short stories

Mondo giovane (2006, Editrice La Ginestra) 
Lo scrigno cosmopolita (2006, Editrice La Ginestra) 
Il dono della diversità (2013, Tempesta Editore) 
Amori diversi (2013, Tempesta Editore)

Non-fiction

Nato da un crimine contro l'umanità. Dialogo con mio padre sulle conseguenze del colonialismo italiano (2022, Tab Edizioni)

Stage works 

Tramonto (1999)
Robin Dream (2005)
La vera storia di Jean-Baptiste du Val-de-Grâce, oratore della razza umana (2008)
Loving vs Virginia (2010)
Storie e Notizie (2010)
Nostro figlio è nato (2012)
Il dono della diversità (2013)
Roba da bambini (2014) 
Questa è la paura (2015)
La truffa dei migranti (2015)
Quando (2016)
Curami (2017)
Le sette vite di Eva (2018)
Storie da pazzi di storie (2019)

Sources 

Diversi libri diversi: scaffali multiculturali e promozione della lettura, Vinicio Ongini, Idest Editore, 2003 – 
Nuovo planetario italiano, Armando Gnisci, Città aperta Edizioni, 2006 – 
L' immagine della società nella fiaba, Franco Cambi, Sandra Landi, Gaetana Rossi, Armando Editore, 2008 – 
Scrivere nella lingua dell'altro: la letteratura degli immigrati in Italia, Daniele Comberiati, Peter Lang Editore, 2010 – 
L'immigrazione raccontata ai ragazzi, Luatti Lorenzo, Nuove Esperienze Editrice, 2011 – 
 E noi? Il posto degli scrittori migranti nella narrativa per ragazzi, Lorenzo Luatti, introduzione di Armando Gnisci, Sinnos Editrice, 2010 - 
 African Theatre 8: Diasporas, Interculture on Stage: Afro-Italian Theatre Capitolo Interculture on Stage: Afro-Italian Theatre, Sabrina Brancato (pp. 52–64) Boydell & Brewer, James Currey, 2009 - 
 Il territorio dalla stiva. I care Child development & disabilities, Angelo Cupini, Franco Angeli editrice, 2010 - ISSN 2036-5888
 Fingertips stained with ink: Notes on new 'migrant writing'in Italy, Volume 8 Interventions, International Journal of Postcolonial Studies, Alessandro Portelli, 2006 - ISSN 1369-801X
 Re-writing history in the literature of the Ethiopian diaspora in Italy, Volume 13 African Identities, Sara Marzagora, 2015 - ISSN 1472-5843

See also 

Teatro di narrazione

References

External links 

 
 Official website

1968 births
Living people
Writers from Naples
21st-century Italian male writers
Italian male short story writers
Italian male actors
21st-century Italian novelists
Italian male novelists
Storytellers
21st-century Italian short story writers
Italian people of Eritrean descent